Plaza Saltillo is a Capital MetroRail commuter rail station in Austin, Texas.  It is located in East Austin at the corner of Fifth and Comal Street adjacent to the Plaza Saltillo complex which, in turn, was built in 1998 as a result of a collaborative effort between the city of Austin, the city of Saltillo (a sister city of Austin), Capital Metro and Ole Mexico, an east Austin cultural group. To smoothly incorporate the station in the existing plaza layout and still ensure ADA accessibility, the platform was built with a unique "split ramp" layout, with two high-level sections split by a pair of wheelchair ramps. Railcars stop with their doors aligned with the high-level platform sections, providing level access. With Project Connect, the Green Line will also stop at this station.

References

External links
 Plaza Saltillo station overview
 Station from 5th Street from Google Maps Street View

Capital MetroRail stations in Austin
Railway stations in the United States opened in 2010
Railway stations in Travis County, Texas